Andrea of Rosario Cedrón Rodríguez (born 24 December 1993 in Trujillo, Peru) is a Peruvian professional swimmer. She was the only Peruvian swimmer in the Olympic games of London 2012. She also represented her country at the Olympic games of Rio de Janeiro 2016.

Biography 
Andrea is a daughter of Carlos Cedrón Medina and Jessenia Rodríguez Lescano. She has a sister  named Gianella. She studied at the Institución Educativa Particular Inmaculada Virgen de La Puerta. She is known as "the Peruvian siren".

Cedrón has represented Peru worldwide competing in the Olympic games of London 2012 in the 400 metres free style, coming in the 33rd place.

She competed in the 2013 Bolivarian Games, in Trujillo, winning a total of six medals, three gold and three bronze.

Andrea holds the national record of 2:03.38 in the 200 metres freestyle, that allowed her classify for the 2015 Pan American Games, where she came in 7th place.

She participated in the 200 meter freestyle event at the 2016 Summer Olympics in Rio de Janeiro, taking the 39th place.

References 

Swimmers at the 2010 Summer Youth Olympics
Swimmers at the 2011 Pan American Games
1993 births
Swimmers at the 2012 Summer Olympics
Swimmers at the 2016 Summer Olympics
Swimmers at the 2015 Pan American Games
Living people
Olympic swimmers of Peru
Peruvian female freestyle swimmers
Pan American Games competitors for Peru
21st-century Peruvian women